Sorbi may refer to:

People
 Attilio Sorbi (born 1959), Italian football manager and player
 Raffaello Sorbi (1844–1931), Italian painter

Species
 Phyllonorycter sorbi, species of moth
 Stigmella sorbi, species of moth

Italian-language surnames